Robert Jensen (born 1958) is a professor of journalism at the University of Texas at Austin.

Robert Jensen may also refer to:

 Robert Jensen (economist) (born 1970), professor of economics at the Wharton School of the University of Pennsylvania
 Robert C. Jensen (1928-2011), American farmer and politician
 Robert W. Jensen (artist) (1929–2018), American  painter, singer and dancer
 Robert R. Jensen (born 1949), American mathematician
 Robert A. Jensen (born 1965), crisis management expert
 Robert Jensen  (television personality), Dutch DJ
 Robert Jensen (footballer), Danish footballer

See also
 Robert Jenson (1930–2017), American theologian